Major-General Michael Dalrymple Regan  (born 6 January 1942) is a former British Army officer.

Military career
Educated at St Boniface's Catholic College and the Royal Military Academy Sandhurst, Regan was commissioned into the King's Shropshire Light Infantry in 1962. He became commanding officer of 3rd Battalion The Light Infantry in 1982. He went on to be commander 20th Armoured Brigade in 1985, Deputy Chief of Staff at Headquarters UK Land Forces in 1989 and General Officer Commanding Wales and Western District in 1991. His last appointment was as Director-General, Adjutant General's Corps in 1994 before retiring in 1996.

In 1974 he married Victoria Grenfell; they have two daughters.

References

 

1942 births
Living people
British Army generals
Companions of the Order of the Bath
Commanders of the Order of the British Empire
King's Shropshire Light Infantry officers
The Light Infantry officers